Willie Whopper is an animated cartoon character created by American animator Ub Iwerks. The Whopper series was the second from the Iwerks Studio to be produced by Pat Powers and distributed through Metro-Goldwyn-Mayer. 14 shorts were produced in 1933 to 1934.

History
Willie is a young lad who tells of his many outlandish adventures, which are then depicted on-screen. His fantastic accounts are, in fact, outright lies or "whoppers". His stories are usually preceded by his memorable catchphrase, "Say, did I ever tell ya this one?" 

The character's first-produced film was The Air Race (1933), in which Willie tells of how he entered and won the 1933 National Air Race—even receiving a kiss from Amelia Earhart in the end. The short reflects Iwerks' own fascination with aviation. One scene even involves a plane crashing into a "Fireworks" stand which, afterwards is reduced in spelling to "I WERKS" (the animator Ub Iwerks' last name).

The Air Race was initially left unreleased because distributor MGM rejected it, asking for a revision to explain more about why Willie entered the race. In the largely reanimated revision—Spite Flight (1933)—the story shows Willie interested in the race's cash prize because it will help him pay off his girlfriend's mom's mortgage. The new footage also turns Willie's racing rival into the girlfriend's landlord.

Animator Grim Natwick initially designed Willie for The Air Race and the subsequent Play Ball, the character's first theatrical release. He was, at first, tall and lanky, much like a boy version of the earlier Flip the Frog. Iwerks wasn't completely satisfied with this design and decided to make the character more "cartoonlike". So, by the series' fourth entry, Stratos-Fear, Willie became roly-poly and more endearing to audiences. Critics too especially went for this new change. Before 1933 was over, Willie also appeared in his first Cinecolor endeavor, Davy Jones' Locker.

1934 was the final production year for the Whopper series. However, some of Willie's best emerged from this particular year. One interesting 1934 entry is The Good Scout, an outrageous short in which boy scout Willie manages to help a beautiful girl who has been kidnapped by a big brute in downtown New York City. The bulk of the film's soundtrack is composed of a jazzy Jelly Roll Morton 78-rpm record and its backgrounds are breathtaking. The short also features a Bosko look-alike, possibly a joke on the parts of Harman-Ising animators Bob Stokes and Norm Blackburn.  The final entry in the series was Viva Willie released on September 20, 1934. Other Iwerks staffers on the series included Al Eugster, Norm Blackburn, Berny Wolf and Shamus Culhane (who referred to Willie as a "boy Baron von Münchhausen").

After MGM dropped Iwerks, they hired Hugh Harman and Rudolf Ising to produce a cartoon series called Happy Harmonies directly for the studio. Harman and Ising had just left Warner Brothers, where they had been producing Looney Tunes and Merrie Melodies for Leon Schlesinger.

Filmography

1933

1 Filmed in Cinecolor

1934

1 Filmed in Cinecolor

Further reading
 Leslie Iwerks and John Kenworthy, The Hand Behind the Mouse (Disney Editions, 2001) and documentary of the same name (DVD, 1999)
 Leonard Maltin, Of Mice and Magic: A History of American Animated Cartoons (Penguin Books, 1987)
 Jeff Lenburg, The Great Cartoon Directors (Da Capo Press, 1993)

See also
 The Golden Age of American animation

References

External links
Willie Whopper at Don Markstein's Toonopedia. Archived from the original on September 13, 2015.
The Air Race, a Willie Whopper cartoon

Ub Iwerks Studio series and characters
MGM cartoon characters
Film characters introduced in 1933
Film series introduced in 1933
Metro-Goldwyn-Mayer animated short films